This is a list of Christmas markets from around the world.

Christmas markets are listed using their unique name. The list is ordered by continent and then by country.

Worldwide Christmas markets

Europe

Austria 

Christkindlmarkt – Innsbruck, Tyrol
Christkindlmarkt – Salzburg, Salzburg
Christkindlmarkt Rathaus – Vienna, Vienna
Christkindlmarkt Karlsplatz– Vienna, Vienna
Christkindlmarkt – Villach, Carinthia
Weihnachtsmarkt – Salzburg, Salzburg

Belgium 
 Plaisirs d'hiver – Winterpret – Winter Wonders – Brussels
 Village de Noël de Liège – Liège
Bruges Christmas Market – Bruges

Bosnia and Herzegovina 
 Sarajevo Holiday Market – Sarajevo

Bulgaria 
 Deutscher Weihnachtsmarkt Sofia

Croatia 
 Advent in Zagreb – Zagreb Christmas Market

Czech Republic 
  – Prague
  – Brno

Denmark 
 Christianias Julemarked – Christianshavn/Christiania, Copenhagen
 Jul i Den Gamle By – The Old Town, Aarhus
 Tivolis Julemarked – Inner City, Copenhagen
 Fields Jule by – Fields Shopping Center Copenhagen Ørestad )

England 

 Bath Christmas Market – Bath, Somerset
 Beverley Festival of Christmas – Beverley, East Yorkshire
 Birmingham Christmas Market and Craft Fair – Birmingham
 Bournemenouth Christmas Market – Bournemouth, Dorset
 Bristol Christmas Market – Bristol
 Chester Christmas Market – Chester, Cheshire
 Deepdale Christmas Market – Burnham Deepdale, Norfolk
 Exeter Christmas Market – Exeter, Devon
 Frankfurt Christmas Market – Birmingham
 Frankfurt Christmas Market – Leeds
 Lincoln Christmas Market – Lincoln (1982 - 2022)
 Liverpool Christmas Market – Liverpool
 Bankside Winter Market – Bankside, London
 Cologne Christmas Market at Southbank Centre (from Cologne) – Bankside, London
 Hyde Park Winter Wonderland Christmas Market – Hyde Park, London
 Manchester Christmas Markets – Manchester
 Newcastle Christmas Markets – Grey's Monument, Newcastle upon Tyne
 Victorian Festival of Christmas – Portsmouth Historic Dockyard, Portsmouth
 Waddesdon Manor Christmas Market – Waddesdon Manor
 Winchester Cathedral Christmas Market – Winchester, Hampshire
 The Winter Forest – Broadgate, London
 Alton Towers – Staffordshire, West Midlands.
 Keech Christmas Market, Barnfield College, Luton.
 Leighton Buzzard Christmas Psychic & Wellbeing Fair, Leighton Buzzard, Bedfordshire.
 Flitwick Christmas Special Foodie Fest, Flitwick, Bedfordshire.
 Huntingdon Christmas Market, Huntingdon, Cambridgeshire.

Estonia
Tallinn Christmas Market – Tallinn

Finland
Tampereen Joulutori, Central Square, Tampere
Tuomaan markkinat, Senate Square, Helsinki
Turun Joulutori, Market Square, Turku

France 
Christmas Market, Angers, Pays de la Loire
Five Christmas Markets – Colmar, Alsace
Christmas Market, Lyon
Christmas Market, Metz
Christmas Market of the Alpes/Marché de Noël des montagnes, Grenoble
Christmas Market, Mulhouse, Alsace
Christmas Market, Nantes, Pays de la Loire
Christmas Market, Sélestat, Alsace
Christkindelsmärik – Strasbourg, Alsace
Village de Noël (Christmas Village), Reims, Champagne
Christmas Market, Valbonne, Alpes Maritimes

Germany 
Berlin
Berliner Kinderweihnachtsmarkt
Spandauer Weihnachtsmarkt
Weihnachtszauber market in Gendarmenmarkt
Nostalgischer Weihnachtsmarkt
Christkindlesmarkt – Karlsruhe, Baden-Württemberg
Christkindlesmarkt – Nuremberg, Bavaria
Christkindlmarkt – Regensburg, Bavaria
Christkindlmarkt – Munich, Bavaria
Christkindlesmarkt – Augsburg, Bavaria
Erfurter Weihnachtsmarkt – Erfurt, Thuringia
Chemnitzer Weihnachtsmarkt – Chemnitz, Saxony
Leipziger Weihnachtsmarkt – Leipzig, Saxony
Magdeburger Weihnachtsmarkt – Magdeburg, Saxony-Anhalt
Mainzer Weihnachtsmarkt – Mainz, Rhineland-Pfalz
Märchenmarkt – Gera, Thuringia 
Märchenweihnachtsmarkt – Kassel, Hesse
Striezelmarkt – Dresden, Saxony
Weihnachtsmarkt – Aachen, North Rhine-Westphalia
Weihnachtsmarkt – Ansbach, Bayern
Weihnachtsmarkt – Bad Homburg, Hesse
Weihnachtsmarkt – Bonn, North Rhine-Westphalia
Weihnachtsmarkt – Braunschweig, Lower Saxony
Weihnachtsmarkt – Bremen, Free Hanseatic City of Bremen
Weihnachtsmarkt – Cologne, North Rhine-Westphalia
Weihnachtsmarkt – Dortmund, North Rhine-Westphalia
Weihnachtsmarkt – Düsseldorf, North Rhine-Westphalia
Weihnachtsmarkt – Essen, North Rhine-Westphalia
Weihnachtsmarkt – Frankfurt am Main, Hesse
Weihnachtsmarkt – Hamburg, Hamburg-Mitte borough
Weihnachtsmarkt – Heidelberg, Baden-Württemberg
Weihnachtsmarkt – Karlsruhe, Baden-Württemberg
Weihnachtsmarkt – Koblenz, Rheinland-Pfalz
Weihnachtsmarkt – Lübeck, Schleswig-Holstein
Weihnachtsmarkt – Münster, North Rhine-Westphalia
Weihnachtsmarkt – Pforzheim, Baden-Württemberg
Weihnachtsmarkt – Rostock, Mecklenburg-Vorpommern
Weihnachtsmarkt – Stuttgart, Baden-Württemberg
Sternschnuppenmarkt Twinkling Star Market – Wiesbaden, Hesse
Weihnachtsmarkt – Würzburg, Bayern
Weihnachtsmarkt – Windsbach, Bayern
Weihnachtsmarkt – Schweinfurt, Bayern

Hungary 
 Budapest Christmas Fair – Budapest, Hungary

Italy 
 South Tyrol
 Mercatino di Natale – Christkindlmarkt – Bolzano
 Bosco Incantato – Winterwald – Bolzano
 Meraner Advent – Natale a Merano – Merano
 Weihnachtsmarkt – Mercatino di Natale – Brixen
 Weihnachtsmarkt – Mercatino di Natale – Sterzing
 Weihnachtsmarkt – Mercatino di Natale – Bruneck

Latvia 
Riga Christmas Market (Rīgas Ziemassvētku tirdziņš) – Riga

Luxembourg 
 Winterlights Luxembourg City

Netherlands 
 Kerstmarkt Dordrecht – Dordrecht, South Holland

Northern Ireland 
Belfast Continental Christmas Market, City Hall, Belfast

Norway 
 Julebyen Egersund Egersund

Poland 
Christmas Market – Kraków, Lesser Poland
Christmas Market – Wrocław, Lower Silesia (largest in Poland)
Christmas Market – Warsaw, Masovia
Christmas Market – Gdańsk, Pomerania
Christmas Market – Toruń, Kuyavia-Pomerania
Poznanskie Betlejem – Poznań, Greater Poland
Christmas Market – Katowice, Silesia
Christmas Market – Pszczyna, Silesia

Romania 
 Christmas Market – Bucharest
 Christmas Market (Târgul de Crăciun) – Sibiu, Sibiu County – 18 November to 3 January

 Christmas Market (Târgul de Crăciun) – Cluj-Napoca, Cluj County – 1 to 26 December
 Christmas Market (Târgul de Crăciun) – Timișoara, Timiș County
 Christmas Market (Târgul de Crăciun) – Oradea, Bihor County
 Christmas Market (Târgul de Crăciun) – Sighișoara, Mureș County −18 to 23 December
 Christmas/Winter Market (Târgul de Crăciun/Iarnă) – Arad, Arad County – usually held between 1 December  (National Day of Romania) until the Epiphany 7/8 January

Scotland 
Edinburgh
Edinburgh Highland Village Christmas Market
Edinburgh Traditional German Christmas Market
Glasgow Traditional Christmas Market – Glasgow
St Enoch Christmas market.

Serbia 
 Winter Fest – Novi Sad, Serbia

Slovakia 
  – Bratislava, Slovakia

Sweden 
 Malmö Christmas market – Traditional Christmas market. The biggest Christmas event in the heart of the city.

Switzerland 
Christkindlimarkt – Zürich

Wales 
Cardiff Christmas Market – Cardiff
Cambrian Christmas Market – Colwyn Bay

North America

Canada 
 Christkindl Market – Kitchener, Ontario
 Christkindl Market – Winnipeg, Manitoba
 Marché de Noël allemand – Quebec, Quebec
 Toronto Christmas Market – Distillery District, Toronto
 Vancouver Christmas Market – Vancouver, British Columbia

United States 
Canandaigua Christkindl Market – Canandaigua, New York
Carmel Christkindlmarkt – Carmel, Indiana
Christkindl Market – Arlington, Texas
Christkindlmarkt – Baltimore, Maryland
Christkindlmarkt – Bethlehem, Pennsylvania
Christkindlmarkt – Cape Coral, Florida
Christkindlmarket – Chicago, Illinois
Christkindl Market – Denver, Colorado
Christkindlmarket Des Moines – Des Moines, Iowa
Christkindlmarkt – Ferdinand, Indiana
Christkindlmarkt – Front Royal, Virginia
Christkindlmarkt – Helen, Georgia
Christkindlmarkt – Leavenworth, Washington
Christkindl Market – Mifflinburg, Pennsylvania
Christkindlmarkt – Monroe, Wisconsin – Turner Hall
Christkindlmarkt – Rolla, Missouri
Christkindlmarkt – Tulsa, Oklahoma
Christmas Village – Philadelphia, Pennsylvania
Cincideutsch Christkindlmarkt – Cincinnati, Ohio
Columbus Circle Holiday Market – Columbus Circle, New York City
Downtown Holiday Market – Washington, D.C.
European Christmas Market – St. Paul, Minnesota
German Christmas Market of Oconomowoc – Oconomowoc, Wisconsin
Germania Society Christkindlmarkt – Cincinnati, Ohio
Holiday Shops – Bryant Park, New York City
Old World Christmas Market – Nashua, New Hampshire
Union Square Holiday Market – Union Square, Manhattan, New York City
Weihnachtsmarkt – Harmony, Pennsylvania
Weihnachtsmarkt – New Braunfels, Texas
Weihnachtsmarkt – Sparta, New Jersey
Yuletide Cheer Festival – Blissfield, Michigan

Asia

China 
Shanghai German Christmas Market – Shanghai, China

Japan 
Weihnachtsmarkt – Osaka, Japan
Munich Christmas Market – Sapporo, Japan
Tokyo Christmas Market - Tokyo, Japan
Red Brick Warehouse Christmas Market - Yokohama, Japan

Syria
 Christmas Market – Aleppo, Syria

Taiwan 
 Taipei German Christmas Market – Taipei, Taiwan
 Taipei European Christmas Market – Taipei, Taiwan

Oceania

New Zealand 
German Mid-Winter Christmas– Christchurch

Further reading

Notes

External links 
Listing of Christmas Markets in Germany Official Website of the German National Tourist Board
German Christmas Markets Dates, tourist information and full listing of Germany's most important Christmas Markets
Viennese Christmas Markets Dates, tourist information and listings of Vienna's most important Christmas Markets

Markets